Ebuma Island is a small island in China Strait, between Samarai and the mainland, Milne Bay Province, Papua New Guinea.

History 

George and Edna-May Hancock purchased the island in 1960, they built a house on it and lived there from 1960 - 1985. 
Ernie Evennett married Lynne Hancock and George Hancock, Lynne’s father built a second house on the island in 1962 for them, Ernie Evennett was allowed to live on Ebuma long after because of his relationship to their daughter. . 
Today his son is the only one living there.

Geography 
Ebuma Island is a rocky raised islet, with low cliffs on most sides. Privately owned.
The island is part of Samarai Islands of the Louisiade Archipelago.

Administration 
The island belongs to Samarai North Ward. belong to Bwanabwana Rural Local Level Government Area LLG, Samarai-Murua District, which are in Milne Bay Province.

Demographics 
The population on the last census was 1.

References

Islands of Milne Bay Province
Louisiade Archipelago